Liv Bjørk is a Norwegian handball goalkeeper. She played 126 matches for the Norway women's national handball team between 1969 and 1982.  She participated at the 1971, 1973, 1975 and 1982 World Women's Handball Championship.

References

Year of birth missing (living people)
Living people
Norwegian female handball players